Ballophilidae is a monophyletic family of centipedes belonging to the order Geophilomorpha and superfamily Himantarioidea. Some authorities dismiss this group as a family, citing phylogenetic analysis, and instead refer to this clade as Ballophilinae, a possible subfamily within the family Schendylidae. The number of legs in this clade varies within species and ranges from 37 to 113 pairs of legs. Species in this clade tend to have more leg-bearing segments and greater intraspecific variability in this number than generally found in the family Schendylidae.

Genera

Genera:
 Afrotaenia Chamberlin, 1951
 Ballophilus Cook, 1896
 Caritohallex Crabill, 1960
Cerethmus
Clavophilus
Diplethmus
Ityphilus
Koinethmus
Leucolinum
Taeniolinu
Tanophilus
Zygethmus

References

Geophilomorpha
Centipede families